Raquel Chang-Rodriguez is an American literature historian, specializing in Hispanic literature, currently a Distinguished Professor at City University of New York. She is an honorary professor at National University of San Marcos and has an honorary doctorate from National and Kapodistrian University of Athens.

Publications
Select works:
 Violencia y subversión en la prosa colonial hispanoamericana siglos XVI y XVII, 1982
 Voces de Hispanoamerica : antologia literaria, 1988
 Hidden messages : representation and resistance in Andean colonial drama, 1999
 "Aquí, ninfas del sur, venid ligeras" : voces poéticas virreinales, 2008

References

Year of birth missing (living people)
Living people
American literary historians 
City University of New York faculty
21st-century American historians
Colgate University faculty
Columbia University faculty
Historians from New York (state)